"Fils de joie" (English: "Son of joy") is a song by Belgian musician Stromae. It is the third single from his album Multitude, which was released on 4 March 2022. The 7-inch single was released on 23 June 2022.

The song tells the story of the child of a prostitute. The song includes a sample from a teaser for Netflix series Bridgerton. The melody combines baroque sounds and the ardor of Brazilian funk carioca. The song was also used in the soundtrack of video game FIFA 23. 

A music video, directed by Henry Scholfield, was released on 7 March 2022. In the video, Stromae portrays a president of a fictional country. He gives a speech at a national funeral for a missing sex worker, surrounded by officers and wreaths, as a military parade and funeral procession unfolds.

Track listing

Charts

Weekly charts

Year-end charts

Certifications

Awards

Release history

References

2022 singles
2022 songs
Stromae songs
Songs written by Stromae